Gullballen (English: the Golden Ball) is a Norwegian football award given by the Norwegian Football Federation to the best male and female Norwegian footballers each year. The award replaced Kniksen of the Year as the main award given to the best Norwegian footballer in a calendar year.

The first award was given in 2014 to Stefan Johansen. Until 2018, the award was given to only one player, either male or female. In 2015, Ada Hegerberg became the first woman to win the award. Hegerberg, Caroline Graham Hansen, and Erling Haaland are the only players to have won the award more than twice. Gullballen has been given out at Norwegian sport award Idrettsgallaen since 2015.

Winners

2014–2017

2018–present

From 2018, the Gullballen has been awarded to both a male and female footballer.

By club

Men's clubs

Women's clubs

References

2014 establishments in Norway
European football trophies and awards
Awards established in 2014
Football in Norway
Norwegian sports trophies and awards